Mehmet Sabri Erçetin (1876 in Bursa – May 3, 1956) was an officer of the Ottoman Army and a general of the Turkish Army.

See also
List of high-ranking commanders of the Turkish War of Independence

Sources

External links

1876 births
1956 deaths
People from Bursa
Ottoman Imperial School of Military Engineering alumni
Ottoman Army officers
Ottoman military personnel of the Balkan Wars
Ottoman military personnel of World War I
Turkish military personnel of the Greco-Turkish War (1919–1922)
Turkish Army generals
Recipients of the Liakat Medal
Recipients of the Medal of Independence with Red Ribbon (Turkey)
Members of the Grand National Assembly of Turkey